The Sopore massacre refers to the killing of at least 43 civilians by the Indian Border Security Force (BSF) who were travelling on a bus from Bandipur to Sopore in Kashmir on 6 January 1993.

Background
On the morning of 6 January 1993, a group of 7–8 armed JKLF militants attacked a platoon of Border Security Force soldiers at Baba Yousuf Lane near Sopore and killed at least one soldier.

Firing
In this bloody Wednesday some shopkeepers were not allowed to come out and they were burned alive inside shops. In all, official Indian Government reports state that 250 shops and 50 homes were burned down although other sources claim as many as 450 buildings were burned down by the border security force. The Independent reported:

The Border Security Forces sprayed a public coach with machine-gun fire, killing the driver and more than 15 civilians, said witnesses. Three other cars were also fired on, and then the paramilitary forces set the vehicles ablaze. Next, they began herding the native Kashmiris into shops and houses, said witnesses. Then the security forces shot them, splashed paraffin over the bodies and set the buildings alight.

Response
The Indian government claimed that the high casualties were the result of an intense gun battle between the BSF soldiers and militants in which an explosives cache belonging to the militants exploded and spread the fire to nearby buildings. However, the government later initiated a judicial inquiry into the matter and suspended several BSF officers due to the publicity the incident had generated. The day after the massacre, thousands of Kashmiris, defying a government-imposed curfew, protested against the actions of the BSF soldiers on the streets of Sopore. However, Muslim leaders, left-wing politicians and human rights organizations criticized Saxena for failing to stop human rights violations by the security forces in Kashmir and demanded a parliamentary delegation be sent to assess the destruction.

See also
Bijbehara massacre
Kupwara massacre
Zakoora and Tengpora massacre

References

Mass murder in 1993
1993 in India
January 1993 crimes
January 1993 events in Asia
Massacres in 1993
1990s in Jammu and Kashmir
Massacres in Jammu and Kashmir
Sopore
Massacres committed by India